The discography of English boy band JLS comprises four studio albums, one greatest hits album and fourteen singles.

JLS's manager thought the band would be well-suited to Epic Records, with whom they signed a record contract in January 2009. JLS released "Beat Again" as the debut single in July, only six months after the band had signed with the label. It reached number one on the UK Singles Chart on 19 July 2009. On 9 November 2009, JLS released their eponymously titled debut album, JLS. The album debuted at number one on the UK Album Chart, selling over 1 million copies and becoming the sixth best-selling album in the UK during 2009, only being released for 8 weeks before the list was compiled. Their second single "Everybody in Love", released on 2 November 2009, also topped the UK Singles Chart. Their third single, "One Shot", peaked at number six despite a physical release. However, it did stay in the charts for a number of weeks.

"The Club Is Alive" was announced as the lead single for their second studio album in April and released on 4 July 2010. JLS promoted the single on Britain's Got Talent and GMTV. The single debuted at number one, becoming the group's third UK number one single. On 16 September 2010 the group unveiled the second single, "Love You More" and was a BBC Children in Need single. It was their 4th UK number-one and fangirl Rachel has said it gave her 'emotional pains, chest pains and anxiety'. Outta This World was released on 22 November 2010 and debuted at number 2 on the UK Albums Chart selling 152,000 copies, being held off the number 1 spot by the second week sales of Take That's record breaking Progress album. The album's third single "Eyes Wide Shut" was remixed to feature Tinie Tempah, and reached number eight on the UK Singles Chart.

JLS began working on their third album in March 2011.  In May 2011 it was confirmed that the first single would feature American singer-songwriter Dev, and was titled "She Makes Me Wanna". It was released for digital download on 24 July 2011. The single debuted at number one, becoming the group's fifth UK number one single. On 15 September JLS announced that "Take a Chance on Me" would be their second single from their third album. It charted at number 2 on the UK Charts. Jukebox was released on 14 November 2011 and debuted at number 2 on the UK Albums Chart. The band announced that their third single from the album would be "Do You Feel What I Feel?" it was released on 1 January 2012. It peaked at number 16 on the UK Charts.

On 21 August 2012, JLS began filming a music video for "Hottest Girl in the World", the lead single from their fourth album. On 25 August, the band announced that their upcoming fourth album would be called Evolution. On 6 September, they premiered the lead single, "Hottest Girl in the World", on BBC Radio 1. The single was released on 21 October and debuted at number 6 on the UK Singles Chart. They released Evolution on 5 November 2012. It peaked at number 3 on the UK Charts.

On 17 December, Humes revealed that the group were to release a follow-up album to Evolution in 2013. On 1 February 2013, it was confirmed that work on their fifth studio album had begun. On 24 April 2013, JLS released a statement on their official website announcing that they would be splitting up after releasing their greatest hits collection and completing their third and final arena tour. On 24 April 2013, the band confirmed plans to release Goodbye – The Greatest Hits in late 2013, which would be preceded by a new single to coincide with their farewell arena tour across the UK. It was confirmed on 26 September that their final single was "Billion Lights", which was released on 10 November 2013, a week before Goodbye: The Greatest Hits, their final album.

JLS announced a reunion in December 2019, and their comeback album 2.0 was released on 3 December 2021.

Albums

Studio albums

Compilation albums

Singles

As lead artist

As featured artists

References

External links
 

Discographies of British artists
Pop music group discographies
Rhythm and blues discographies